Group H of the 2018 FIFA World Cup took place from 19 to 28 June 2018. The group consisted of Poland, Senegal, Colombia, and Japan. The top two teams, Colombia and Japan, advanced to the round of 16. For the first time in World Cup history, the "fair play" rule was invoked to break a tie. Japan and Senegal finished with identical scores and goal differences to tie for second behind Colombia. Japan were awarded the place in the round of 16 based on receiving fewer yellow cards in their three matches.

Teams

Notes

Standings

In the round of 16:
The winners of Group H, Colombia, advanced to play the runners-up of Group G, England.
The runners-up of Group H, Japan, advanced to play the winners of Group G, Belgium.

Matches
All times listed are local time.

Colombia vs Japan
The two teams had met in three previous matches, most recently in a 2014 FIFA World Cup group stage game, won by Colombia 4–1.

In the third minute, Carlos Sánchez blocked Shinji Kagawa's 20-yard shot with his arm and the referee pointed to the penalty spot before showing the midfielder a straight red card. After lengthy protests, Sánchez eventually left the field and Kagawa slotted the penalty into the bottom right corner of the net. José Pékerman then replaced Juan Cuadrado with Wílmar Barrios at the half-hour mark, and an equaliser arrived nine minutes later, from a Juan Fernando Quintero free kick, shot low under the jumping wall which the goalkeeper failed to keep out. In the second half, David Ospina dived full length to his left to stop Takashi Inui's curling 20-yard shot. Yuya Osako then headed the ball into the far corner of the net from a Keisuke Honda corner from the left. With 13 minutes left, James Rodríguez's strike from inside the box was turned over the crossbar by the outstretched leg of Osako.

Quintero became the first Colombia player in history to score at two World Cups. Japan became the first Asian team to beat a side from South America in the competition's history. Honda became the first player from an Asian nation to provide an assist in three different World Cup tournaments since 1966. Eiji Kawashima (35 years, 91 days) became the oldest player to appear for Japan in a World Cup finals match.

Poland vs Senegal
The two teams had never met before.

Senegal had the first clear chance in the 18th minute, M'Baye Niang dragging an effort wide after a break. Senegal took the lead when Idrissa Gueye's 20-yard shot took a huge deflection off Thiago Cionek to wrong-foot Poland goalkeeper Wojciech Szczęsny and give Senegal the lead. Robert Lewandowski stepped up to float a 25-yard free-kick over the wall, Khadim N'Diaye dived to turn the ball away. Grzegorz Krychowiak hooked a high ball back towards his own goal from inside the Senegal half and with Szczesny attempting to intercept by coming out of his penalty area, Niang knocked the ball past him before side footing into an unguarded goal. Arkadiusz Milik slotted a Łukasz Piszczek cross wide at the near post. Dawid Kownacki's headed attempt was saved late on by N'Diaye but the goalkeeper was beaten by Krychowiak's header with five minutes to go after a free kick from the right.

Cionek became the first Polish player to score an own goal in a World Cup match. Cionek's own goal was only the second time an African nation has benefited from an own goal in a World Cup match, after Andoni Zubizarreta for Spain against Nigeria in 1998. Senegal continued their impressive undefeated run in an opening World Cup match, having beaten France 1–0 in 2002.

Japan vs Senegal
The two teams had faced each other three times, most recently in a friendly in 2003, won by Senegal 1–0.

Senegal took the lead in the 11th minute when Japanese goalkeeper Eiji Kawashima spilled a Youssouf Sabaly shot into the path of Sadio Mané, who hit the ball in from close range. Japan responded in the 34th minute when Yuto Nagatomo received a ball over the top and sent it to Takashi Inui, who curled a shot into the bottom corner past the Senegalese defenders. Yuya Osako missed a close chance in front of the Senegal net and Inui's shot struck the crossbar, before Senegal retook the lead in the 71st minute, when Moussa Wagué finished a low Sabaly cross into the top corner. Japan equalised again just seven minutes later, when Senegal goalkeeper Khadim N'Diaye failed to collect an Osako cross, leading to Inui sending the ball to Japanese substitute Keisuke Honda, who finished at the near post.

Wagué became the youngest African goalscorer at a World Cup, at the age of 19 years and 268 days. With his goal, Honda became the first Japanese player to score at three different World Cups, as well as the top scoring Asian player in World Cup history with four goals. Japan equalled their best points tally of four after two group games at a World Cup, just as they did as co-hosts in 2002.

Poland vs Colombia
The two teams had met in five matches, most recently in a 2006 friendly, won by Colombia 2–1.

Abel Aguilar was taken from the field on a stretcher in the 32nd minute and was replaced by Mateus Uribe. Shortly after, a cross by James Rodríguez from the right was met by the head of Yerry Mina, who lost his marker to head over Wojciech Szczęsny's outstretched arms and into the net. Juan Fernando Quintero fired wide from 25 yards at the start of the second half. Juan Cuadrado then squared to Radamel Falcao on the edge of the box who lifted his shot well over the crossbar. In the 58th minute, Robert Lewandowski controlled a long pass only to shoot straight into David Ospina's midriff as Poland attempted their first shot on target of the game. Quintero's slide-rule pass presented Falcao with a one-on-one situation and he guided the ball past Szczęsny with the outside of his right foot to double his side's lead. With 15 minutes left on the clock, James' pass from the left found Cuadrado in space through the middle and he took a touch before finishing it into the bottom-right corner of the net.

Poland were the first European nation to be eliminated from the 2018 World Cup. Including Colombia's victory against Poland, there were 14 World Cup goals scored on 24 June 2018 - the most on a single day of action in the competition (maximum 3 games) since 10 June 1990 (also 14).

Japan vs Poland
The two teams had met twice, most recently in a friendly game in 2002, won by Japan 2–0.

Yoshinori Muto's drive forced Łukasz Fabiański to parry, before the goalkeeper smothered a Gōtoku Sakai effort. Eiji Kawashima scooped Kamil Grosicki's header clear. With just over half an hour remaining, Rafał Kurzawa's free-kick from the left picked out Jan Bednarek, who volleyed it into the net from six yards out. Maya Yoshida headed well wide from a left-wing corner. Robert Lewandowski steered Grosicki's pin-point pass over the top.

Poland beat Japan for the first time in an official match, having defeated Japan in four unofficial matches. Poland won each of their 14 games in which they scored first in World Cup finals. Poland  kept a clean sheet at the World Cup for the first time since winning 1–0 against Portugal in 1986. On another side, since the new millennia, Poland had repeated their poor performances in 2002 and 2006 World Cups, eliminated after losing two opening matches before grabbing a late victory in the final match.

There was some criticism of the final minutes in the game, as both sides appeared to settle for the 1–0 scoreline.

Senegal vs Colombia
The two teams had met only once, a 2014 friendly game which ended in a 2–2 draw.

The referee awarded Senegal a penalty in the 17th minute. After consulting VAR, he judged that defender Davinson Sánchez had won the ball before making any contact with Sadio Mané. After half an hour, James Rodríguez was substituted with what appeared to be a recurrence of the injury that kept him out of Colombia's 2–1 loss to Japan. Mané took a free-kick in the 64th minute which he shot off-target. Kalidou Koulibaly got a touch on a Luis Muriel drive to deflect the ball narrowly wide. And in the 74th minute Colombia scored the decisive goal of the game, Juan Quintero's corner from the right found Yerry Mina who rose and crashed home a header that went through goalkeeper Khadim N'Diaye.

With Senegal being the last African team to be knocked out of Russia 2018, there were no teams from Africa in the round of 16 for the first time since the stage was introduced in 1986. Colombia were the only team to reach the knockout stage despite losing their opening match of the tournament. Senegal became the third team to be eliminated despite winning their opening game of the tournament (also Iran and Serbia); and even moreover, this was the first time Senegal got eliminated from the group stage, despite owning a huge advantage prior to the match against Colombia. The last time as many as three teams failed to get through the group stage despite winning their opener was in 2002 (Argentina, Costa Rica, and Russia).

Discipline
Fair play points were used as tiebreakers because the overall and head-to-head records of two teams were tied. These were calculated based on yellow and red cards received in all group matches as follows:
first yellow card: minus 1 point;
indirect red card (second yellow card): minus 3 points;
direct red card: minus 4 points;
yellow card and direct red card: minus 5 points;

Only one of the above deductions were applied to a player in a single match.

References

External links

 2018 FIFA World Cup Group H, FIFA.com

2018 FIFA World Cup
Poland at the 2018 FIFA World Cup
Senegal at the 2018 FIFA World Cup
Colombia at the 2018 FIFA World Cup
Japan at the 2018 FIFA World Cup